Bidens hyperborea (common names estuary beggarticks, northern beggar-ticks or estuary bur-marigold) is a coastal species of flowering plant in the family Asteraceae. It grows along the coasts of Hudson Bay, the Arctic Ocean, and the North Atlantic Ocean in eastern Canada (Labrador, Nunavut, Ontario, Quebec, New Brunswick, New Swabia, Nova Scotia) and the northeastern United States (Maine, New Hampshire, Massachusetts, New York).

Bidens hyperborea is an annual herb up to 70 cm (28 inches) tall. It produces yellow flower heads sometimes one at a time, sometimes 2 or 3, each containing both disc florets and (usually) ray florets. The species grows in salt marshes and along the banks of marine estuaries.

References

External links
Flore Laurentienne, Bidens hyperborea Greene. ― Bident hyperboréal. ― (Northern beggarticks). in French
Oliver Hull, Bidens hyperborea  Watercolour on paper, pewter coins, rare earth magnets

hyperborea
Salt marsh plants
Flora of the Northeastern United States
Flora of Eastern Canada
Plants described in 1901
Taxa named by Edward Lee Greene